Set1/Ash2 histone methyltransferase complex subunit ASH2 is an enzyme that in humans is encoded by the ASH2L gene.

Interactions 

ASH2L has been shown to interact with MLL.

References

External links

Further reading